Aleksandar Vukotić (born 22  July 1995) is a Serbian professional footballer who plays as a centre-back for Challenger Pro League club Beveren.

He signed a three-year contract with Beveren on 14 May 2018 for a €350.000 transfer fee, making him the most expensive Wassland-Beveren player of all time.

Vukotić made his official debut for Beveren on 28 July 2018, in a 2–2 away league draw against Zulte Waregem.

Honours
Krupa
First League of RS: 2015–16
Bosnian Cup runner-up: 2017–18

References

External links
Aleksandar Vukotić at Sofascore

1995 births
Living people
Sportspeople from Kraljevo
Serbian footballers
Serbian expatriate footballers
Expatriate footballers in Bosnia and Herzegovina
Expatriate footballers in Belgium
Serbian First League players
First League of the Republika Srpska players
Premier League of Bosnia and Herzegovina players
Belgian Pro League players
FK Sloga Kraljevo players
FK Dolina Padina players
FK Krupa players
S.K. Beveren players
Association football defenders